Foster Rhea Dulles (24 January 1900, Englewood, New Jersey – 11 September 1970, Jamaica, Vermont) was an American journalist and historian, and author of a number of books. He specialized in political and cultural relations between the United States and East Asia, and advocated internationalism as opposed to American isolationism. The diplomats John Foster Dulles and Allen Dulles were his cousins.

Biography
After secondary education at The Hill School in Pottstown, Pennsylvania, Dulles attended Princeton University, where he graduated with a bachelor's degree in 1921. For two years after graduation he lived in China and taught at Princeton University's Peking Center (Princeton-in-Peking). In 1922 he became a correspondent in Beijing for the Christian Science Monitor. He returned to the United States, and in 1923 he joined the staff of the New York Herald. In 1924 he joined the staff of Foreign Affairs. From 1925 to 1926 he worked at the Paris bureau of the New York Herald Tribune. From 1927 to 1933 he wrote editorials for the New York Evening Post.

Dulles was a Guggenheim Fellow for the academic year 1937–1938. He was a visiting professor of American history at Bennington College for the academic year 1938–1940, at Smith College for the academic year 1939–1940 and at Swarthmore College for the academic year 1940‐1941. He received his PhD from Columbia University in 1940 after submitting his thesis, American Learns to Learn.

Dulles was a professor of history at Ohio State University from 1941 to 1965, when he retired as professor emeritus. He was chair of the history department from 1953 to 1958.

In 1957 he went on State Department cultural exchanges to India, where he lectured at several different universities,
and to the Soviet Union in 1958. He was a Fuibright lecturer in Japan for the academic year 1961‐1962.

Dulles Hall at Ohio State University was built in 1975 and named in his memory.

Family
Foster R. Dulles's father was William Dulles (1857–1915), who was a lawyer and corporation president, and a brother of Allen Dulles and John Foster Dulles.

On August 7, 1926, Foster R. Dulles married Marion Richardson in Bound Brook, New Jersey.

Upon his death in 1970 he was survived by his widow, four daughters, and eight grandchildren.

Selected publications

 (later editions co-authored by Melvyn Dubofsky)

References

1900 births
1970 deaths
20th-century American historians
American male non-fiction writers
20th-century American journalists
American male journalists
The Hill School alumni
Princeton University alumni
Columbia University alumni
Ohio State University faculty
People from Englewood, New Jersey
20th-century American male writers
Historians from New Jersey